Oates is a surname. Notable people with the surname include:

Adam Oates (born 1962), professional ice hockey player
Alice Oates (1849–1887), actress and musical theatre pioneer
Colin Oates (born 1983), English judoka
Corey Oates (born 1994), Australian rugby league player
Cynthia de la Vega Oates, Mexican model
Dan Oates, American police chief
Denese Oates (born 1955), Australian artist
Eugene William Oates (1845–1911), English naturalist
Frank Oates, British African explorer
Graham Oates (footballer, born 1943), English footballer
Graham Oates (footballer, born 1949), English footballer
Jackie Oates (born 1983), English folk musician
John Oates (disambiguation)
Joyce Carol Oates (born 1938), American writer
Lawrence Oates, British Antarctic explorer
Lynette Frances Oates (1921–2013), Australian linguist
Reginald Oates (born 1950), American spree killer
Sheila Oates (born 1939), British and Australian mathematician
Simon Oates, British actor
Stephen B. Oates, American author and biographer
Titus Oates, 17th-century perjurer
Tom Oates, American sportswriter
Wallace Eugene Oates, American economist
Warren Oates, American character actor
William Oates (disambiguation)

See also
Oates (disambiguation)